The following lists events that happened during 2014 in Poland.

Incumbents

Elections

Events

May
25 May 
2014 European Parliament election in Poland
2014 Kraków referendum

June
14 June - Beginning of Polish bugging affair (pl)

August
19 August - The second Polish scientific satellite, Heweliusz, is launched.

September
15 September - Ewa Kopacz becomes Poland's second female prime minister.

December
10 December - The Constitutional Court overturns the 2013 ban on ritual slaughter of animals.

Deaths
10 January - Zbigniew Messner, Communist politician (born 1929)
25 May - Wojciech Jaruzelski, former Communist leader of Poland (born 1923)
22 June - Grzegorz Knapp, motorcycle racer (born 1979)
24 December - Krzysztof Krauze, film director (born 1953)
26 December - Stanisław Barańczak, poet (born 1946)
30 December - Marian Jurczyk, Solidarność activist (born 1935)

See also 
 2014 in Polish television

References 

 
2010s in Poland
Poland
Poland
Years of the 21st century in Poland